Wanted is the 70th studio album by British singer Cliff Richard, released by Papillon Records on 5 November 2001 in the United Kingdom. This album was produced by Alan Tarney who had previously worked with Richard on hits including "We Don't Talk Anymore", "Dreaming", "Wired for Sound" and "Some People". The two had not worked together since the 1989 album Stronger. Wanted reached No. 11 in the UK Albums Chart and stayed in the charts for 8 weeks.

The album is primarily made up of cover songs, including songs by artists such as Elvis Presley, The Beatles, Carole King and Tina Turner. At the time of release the official website for the album explained that it consisted of "hits Cliff's always Wanted to record."

The inspiration for the album came when Richard was sent a copy of Israel Kamakawiwo'ole's recording of "Over the Rainbow" combined with "What a Wonderful World" weeks into the year 2000. He knew immediately he wanted to record it.

Two singles were released from this album, the first being the song "Somewhere Over the Rainbow/What a Wonderful World" which reached No. 11 in the UK Singles Chart and stayed for 6 weeks. The second single release was one of the three original songs on the album, "Let Me Be the One", which came in at No. 29. The two other original songs on the album are "Do You Wonder" and "This Love You Will Never Forget".

The album has sold over 220,000 copies worldwide.

2022 re-release

The album was remastered in 2022, alongside the singles Somewhere Over the Rainbow and Let Me Be The One for digital download.

Track listing

Charts and certifications

Weekly charts

Year-end charts

Certifications

References

Cliff Richard albums
2001 albums
Albums produced by Alan Tarney